State Road 61 (SR 61) is located in the Big Bend area of Florida, running through the state capital of Tallahassee. Throughout most of its length, SR 61 is the unsigned state route assigned to U.S. Route 319.

Route description
SR 61 begins at US 98 as an unsigned route, heading north on US 319, until it splits off with the highway in Crawfordville and becomes County Road 61.  It turns east towards Shadeville Highway (former State Road 365), where afterwards, it runs north as Wakulla Springs Road.

The main, signed portion of SR 61 begins at the Leon County line, where it continues north and eventually rejoins US 319 just south of Capital Circle.  Heading north towards the capitol building, it meets State Road 363 and swaps roads, with SR 61 crossing over to Crawfordville Road and continuing north as Adams Street.  The swapping ends at Paul Russell Road and then joins with US 27 as Monroe Street.  SR 61 leaves downtown Tallahassee as Thomasville Road and just north of its intersection with  I-10 at exit 203, it reunites with US 319 and heads north.  US 319 and SR 61 stay concurrent from there until the road ends at the Georgia state line and continues there as State Route 35.

Major intersections

Florida State Road 61A

State Road 61A (SR 61A) is a  state highway in Tallahassee, Leon County, Florida that connects Florida State Road 61 and Florida State Road 363 in southern Tallahassee. SR 61A is unsigned throughout.

Major intersections

References

External links
Florida 61 (AARoads)

061
061
061
061